William 'Will' R. Smith (born 1973), is an emergency physician and wilderness medicine consultant who lectures about integrating combat medicine into wilderness rescues around the world. He started Wilderness & Emergency Medicine Consulting, a company that helps people with pre-trip planning, online medical support, travel medicine in remote areas and provides expert witness testimony in court cases related to wilderness medicine. As medical director for the National Park Service, he oversaw the largest rescue event ever to occur in Grand Teton National Park. He lives in Jackson, Wyoming where he is an emergency medicine physician at St. John’s Medical Center.

Early life

Smith was born in rural Wyoming where grew up on a cattle ranch near Wheatland. His interest in emergency medicine began in high school where he did his basic EMT training. In college, he began to provide emergency care as a ski patroller.

Wilderness medicine

As president and medical director of Wilderness & Emergency Medicine Consulting, Smith has lectured on bringing battlefield medicine into wilderness rescues, mountain medicine and wildfires.

In addition to his work as the co-medical director of Grand Teton National Park since 2005, he is medical director for Jackson Hole Fire/EMS, Teton County Search and Rescue, Bridger Teton National Forest, USDA, Jackson Hole Outdoor Leadership Institute, Rustic Pathways  and Wyoming operations for Life Flight Network, Airmed International and Wilderness Medics. He Introduced a TEMS—Tactical Emergency Medical Services—program into the national parks, using protocols the military has shown to increase survival. He has trained ski patrol at Jackson Hole Mountain Resort and was hill chief and assistant patrol director at Snowy Range Ski Area in Laramie, Wyoming.

As a teacher and mentor to wilderness students, he has written dozens of peer reviewed medical research reviews for Wilderness & Environmental Medicine, Pre-Hospital Emergency Care, Society of Academic Emergency Medicine Conference, Journal of High Altitude Medicine & Biology, Journal of Military Medicine. He is the author of more than 10 chapters in wilderness medical books.

Lightning strike rescue

On July 21, 2010, Smith was the medical director in a search and rescue operation to find three separate parties of 17 people who were stranded above 13,000 feet near the summit of the Grand Teton during a lightning storm. It was the largest rescue event to occur in Grand Teton National Park. Smith was the medical supervisor for 16 of the 17 people rescued. The rescue operation continued the next day to retrieve the one person who died after being struck by lightning and falling 3,000 feet. The rescue involved two helicopters, a dozen climbing rangers, two mountaineering physicians and numerous other responders. "It was a monumental test of rescuer skills and stamina, combined with incident command management ability," said Fire Rescue Magazine.

Emergency medicine

Smith began studying emergency medicine in high school completing his EMT basic training. After college he completed a paramedic program in Colorado before attending medical school. He also attended the National Search and Rescue Academy and has served on the American Board of Emergency Medicine since 2005.

A clinical assistant professor at the University of Washington School of Medicine, Smith does IV, suture, intubation workshops. He teaches environmental emergencies, spinal and cardiovascular emergencies and responses to terrorism to the Jackson Hole Fire/EMS. He also teaches at the Stanford School of Medicine, Department of Emergency Medicine.

At St. John’s Medical Center in Jackson, Wyoming, he teaches the medical staff about trauma, avalanche injuries, hypothermia and other emergency medical injuries seen in the intensive care unit.

In 2008, he was appointed to American Heart Association, where he served on the First Aid Subcommittee and the American Red Cross First Aid Science Advisory Board. In 2010 and 2015 he helped develop international recommendations for first aid guidelines for the American Red Cross and the American Heart Association.

Military service

In 2001 Smith joined the U.S. Army Reserve, where he rose to the rank of colonel in 2018. From 2005-2014, he was deployed to Iraq, Egypt, Kuwait, Croatia, Panama and El Salvador. He worked at military hospitals, led training exercises and taught courses on altitude illness, disaster medicine, lightning and search and mountain rescues to the army. After 2014, Smith became disaster medicine branch chief for the U.S. Army Medical Command in San Antonio, Texas, medical director for the Emergency Management Division and Medical Response Element and gained top secret security clearance. He is also a subject matter expert for DARPA, the Defense Advanced Research Project Agency.

Education

University of Wyoming Bachelor of Science, Molecular Biology/Pre-Medicine 1991-1995;
Colorado Association of Paramedic Education Paramedic Program, Denver, CO – NREMT-Paramedic 1996-1997;
University of Washington School of Medicine, doctor of medicine 1997-2001;
Medical College of Wisconsin, Emergency Medicine Residency 2001-2004;
National Search and Rescue Academy, Instructor;
American Board of Emergency Medicine, 2005; 
EMS Board Certified (ABEM), 2017;

Awards

 2011 Recognized as one of the top 10 National Innovators by the Journal of EMS
 2014 Wyoming Governor’s Award for EMS Physician Medical Director of the Year
 2015 John P. Pryor, MD, Street Medicine Society Award
 2017 Wilderness Medical Society Ice Axe Award

Professional memberships

 ISTM – International Society of Travel Medicine
 AAEM – American Academy of Emergency Medicine (fellow) 
 AWN -  Academy of Wilderness Medicine (fellow)
 SOMA – Special Operations Medical Association
 DAN – Divers Alert Network
 WMS – Wilderness Medical Society (fellow)
 NAEMSP - National Association of EMS Physicians
 FAEMS - Fellow of the Academy of Emergency Medical Services (FAEMS)
 ACEP - American College Emergency Physicians (Fellow)
 Wyoming Medical Society
 NREMT - National Registry of Emergency Medical Technicians (Paramedic)

Certifications
He has the following certifications:

 Licensed Physician: Wyoming, Wisconsin, Pennsylvania
 Board Certified: Emergency Medicine (ABEM), EMS subspecialty (ABEM-EMS)
 Provider/Instructor: ACLS, PALS, ATLS, BLS
 National Registry of EMTs – Paramedic
 Drug Enforcement Agency (DEA) License: Federal, Wyoming 
 National Pro-board Certification – Firefighter 1
 Incident Qualification Card (Wildland Firefighter Red Card)
 NIMS Incident Command System Certifications: 100, 200, 300, 400, 700

Personal life

Smith lives in Jackson, Wyoming with his wife Janice and two children. His hobbies include mountaineering, skiing, diving, trekking and endurance races.

An avid mountaineer who served in the military and has trekked all over the world, his experience applying combat medicine in the mountains led him to the specialized field of wilderness medicine.

References

External links 
Official Website
Podcast

American emergency physicians
People from Jackson Hole, Wyoming
University of Washington School of Medicine alumni
University of Wyoming alumni
People from Wheatland, Wyoming
1973 births
Living people
21st-century American physicians
United States Army reservists